Humlaa  is a 1992 Bollywood film directed by N. Chandra, starring Ashok Kumar, Dharmendra, Anil Kapoor, Meenakshi Sheshadri, Kimi Katkar and Anupam Kher.

Cast
Ashok Kumar as Devkishan Sharma
Dharmendra as Bhawani
Anil Kapoor as Shiva
Meenakshi Sheshadri
Kimi Katkar as Anita
Anupam Kher as Jagtap
 Dev Kishan as post master 
Sudhir as Bhawani's man

Soundtrack

External links
 

1992 films
1990s Hindi-language films
Films directed by N. Chandra
Films scored by Laxmikant–Pyarelal